Preissia is a genus of liverworts in the order Marchantiales. It is a member of family  Marchantiaceae within that order.  This genus has a worldwide distribution.

Species in Preissia  
 Preissia quadrata, (P. commutata)

References

External links  
  Description and photos of Preissia quadrata
  Diagrams and photo of Preissia quadrata

Marchantiales
Marchantiales genera